Law College Durgapur is a private Law college in Durgapur, West Bengal. This  is one of the first and oldest self-financed Law College affiliated to the University of Burdwan. The college is currently affiliated to Kazi Nazrul University.  This college is also approved by the Bar Council of India.

Courses 
The college offers a five-years integrated B.A. LL.B. (Hons.) course, three-year LL.B. course and two-year Master of Social Work (MSW) course.

See also

References

External links 
 http://lcd.rahul.ac.in/about-us/#
Kazi Nazrul University
University Grants Commission
National Assessment and Accreditation Council

Law schools in West Bengal
Universities and colleges in Purba Bardhaman district
Colleges affiliated to Kazi Nazrul University
Educational institutions established in 2004
2004 establishments in West Bengal